The Boca Roja Formation is a geologic formation located at Huizachal Canyon in Tamaulipas, northeastern Mexico. The formation preserves fossils that were found in rocks dating back to the Cretaceous period. Another dinosaur-bearing formations is the Late Campanian El Gallo Formation. The Boca Roja Formation contains the oldest dinosaur remains found in Mexico.

See also 

 List of fossiliferous stratigraphic units in Mexico

References

External links 
 

Geologic formations of Mexico
Cretaceous Mexico